Another World Is Possible may refer to:

Another World Is Possible: Globalization and Anti-Capitalism, a book by David McNally
"Another World Is Possible", an interview with Noam Chomsky in Imperial Ambitions
Another World Is Possible, a film series by Jamie Moffett
"Another world is possible", the slogan of the World Social Forum
The Another World Is Possible Coalition, an anarchist network formed by Direct Action Network members

See also
Another World Is Possible If…, a book by Susan George